Argemma mabirensis is a species of butterfly in the family Hesperiidae. It is found in the Democratic Republic of the Congo (from the eastern part of the country to the Ituri Forest), Uganda, western Kenya and north-western Tanzania. The habitat consists of forests.

References

Butterflies described in 1925
Hesperiinae